Three-time defending champions Martina Navratilova and Pam Shriver defeated Jo Durie and Ann Kiyomura in the final, 6–3, 6–1 to win the doubles tennis title at the 1984 Virginia Slims Championships. It was Navratilova's seventh Tour Finals doubles title, and Shriver's fourth.

Seeds

Draw

Draw

References
 Official Results Archive (ITF)
 Official Results Archive (WTA)

doubles
1984 Virginia Slims World Championship Series